Standards, Vol. 2 is a jazz album by pianist Keith Jarrett, with Gary Peacock on double bass and Jack DeJohnette on drums; the three are collectively known as Jarrett's  "Standards Trio". It is the successor to their 1983 album Standards, Vol. 1. Like that album, its tracks were recorded during two long sessions in January 1983; these sessions also generated Jarrett's 1984 album of original music, Changes. Standards, Vol. 2 was released by ECM Records on CD and vinyl in April 1985.

In 2008 the Standards albums and Changes were collected into a boxed set, Setting Standards: New York Sessions.

Background
Keith Jarrett, Gary Peacock and Jack DeJohnette had originally worked together on a 1977 album headline by Peacock, Tales of Another, coming back together in 1983 when producer Manfred Eicher proposed a trio album to Jarrett. Jarrett approached Peacock and DeJohnette with the idea of performing standards, which was greatly contrary to the contemporary jazz scene of the early 1980s. In a 2008 interview with the San Francisco Chronicle, Jarrett recalled his reasons for wanting to record standards. "This material was so damn good," he said, "and why was everyone ignoring it and playing clever stuff that sounds all the same?" He told Salon in 2000 that "[a] valuable player doesn't have to play anything new to have value, because it's not about the material, it's about the playing."

The three joined in a studio in Manhattan, New York City for a two and a half day session during which they recorded enough material for three albums, the two Standards albums and Changes. For that session, as in subsequent, the trio did not rehearse or pre-plan their playlist.

DeJohnette, also speaking to the San Francisco Chronicle, recalled that the trio had agreed to "do this until we don't feel like doing this anymore". In 2008, the trio celebrated its 25th anniversary, becoming during that time "the preeminent jazz group interpreting standards".

Reception
Unlike Standards, Vol. 1, Standards, Vol. 2 did not chart, but according to jazz commentator Scott Yanow the album "gets the edge over the first due to its slightly more challenging material". Yanow characterizes Jarrett's performance in this set as "surprisingly playful".

Jazz musician and writer Ian Carr noted in his biography of Jarrett that with these volumes the trio had found "fresh ways of approaching the classic jazz repertoire". In its review of the box set, Pop Matters noted that the material "sounded dazzling in the mid-1980s", adding that "[f]ans of Jarrett, like myself, will always hear these records as having a fresh immediacy".

Track listing
"So Tender" (Jarrett) – 7:19
"Moon and Sand" (William Engvick, Morty Palitz, Alec Wilder) – 8:59
"In Love in Vain" (Jerome Kern, Leo Robin) – 7:14
"Never Let Me Go" (Ray Evans, Jay Livingston) – 7:52
"If I Should Lose You" (Ralph Rainger, Leo Robin) – 8:32
"I Fall in Love Too Easily" (Sammy Cahn, Jule Styne) – 5:12

Personnel
 Keith Jarrett – piano
 Gary Peacock – double bass
 Jack DeJohnette – drums

Production
 Manfred Eicher – producer
 Jan Erik Kongshaug – recording engineer
 Barbara Wojirsch – cover design

References

External links 
Interview at NPR, "Jarrett and Peacock explain how they wound up playing standards after so many years of playing original music." National Public Radio.

Keith Jarrett albums
1985 albums
Standards Trio albums
Gary Peacock albums
Jack DeJohnette albums
Albums produced by Manfred Eicher